The 1842 Liverpool by-election was held on 8 February 1842 and resulted in the election of the unopposed Conservative candidate Howard Douglas. It was caused by the resignation of the previous Conservative MP, Cresswell Cresswell, when he was made a judge of the Court of Common Pleas by the Prime Minister Robert Peel.

References

Liverpool by-election
Liverpool by-election
Unopposed by-elections to the Parliament of the United Kingdom in Liverpool constituencies
1840s in Liverpool
Liverpool by-election